Hakea oldfieldii is a shrub of the family  Proteaceae and is endemic to South West region of Western Australia. It has small white or cream-yellow flowers in profusion in spring.

Description
The rigid dark green leaves may be curving or straight and end in a sharp point. The branchlets are smooth and covered with a bluish green powdery film. The flowers appear in profusion and have an unpleasant scent. Flowering occurs from August to October.

Taxonomy and naming
Hakea oldfieldii was first formally described by George Bentham in 1870 and published the description in Flora Australiensis. The specific epithet  oldfieldii    honours Augustus Frederick Oldfield who first discovered the species.

Distribution and habitat
This species is found in the south-west from Bunbury and Busselton to  the Stirling Range growing in well-drained rocky loam or clay over ironstone in winter-wet sites.

Conservation status
Hakea oldfieldii is classified as "Priority Three" by the Government of Western Australia Department of Parks and Wildlife meaning that it is poorly known and known from only a few locations but is not under imminent threat.

References

oldfieldii
Eudicots of Western Australia
Plants described in 1870